U.S. Highway 65 (US 65) runs north–south through southeastern and north central Arkansas for . US 65 enters the state from Louisiana south of Eudora, running concurrently with the Great River Road. The route exits into Missouri northwest of Omaha. US 65 runs through the major cities of Pine Bluff and Little Rock.

Route description
US 65 is largely a four-lane divided highway, except for its overlaps with Interstates, two-lane section between Louisiana and Lake Village, and many undivided highway sections north of I-40. While the majority of the route travels through rural portions of Arkansas far from any Interstate Highways, the route does have a  concurrency with I-530, I-30, and I-40 between Pine Bluff and Conway through the Little Rock metropolitan area.

US 65 enters Arkansas from Louisiana and follows the Great River Road. US 65 passes through Eudora then continues north intersecting Highway 160. Next, it shares a concurrency with US 82 and 278. It becomes a four-lane highway. while passing through Lake Village. In Lake Village, US 82 separates. Near Dermott, US 65 intersect US 165. In McGehee, US 65 separate from US 278. US 65 passes through rural area. It passes through Dumas where it separates from the Great River Road. US 65 meets with U.S. Route 425 before entering Pine Bluff. US 65 follows I-530 which bypasses Pine Bluff while having a brief concurrency with US 63. I-530 and US 65 continues north. It intersects US 167 at exit 10. It is not accessible from northbound. To access US 167 southbound, motorist will need to take exit 9 then go southbound to exit 10. The three highways enter the Little Rock Metropolitan Area and Little Rock.

In Little Rock, I-530 ends at a high-volume interchange with I-30 and I-440. US 65 shares a concurrency with I-30. Then at the end of I-30, US 167 separates onto I-40 east while US 65 joins I-40 west.

After leaving Little Rock, US 65 separates from I-40 at exit 125 in Conway. US 65 leaves Conway and leaves the Little Rock Metropolitan Area. Then US 65 continues north while passing through the Ozarks and passing through many towns. US 65 passes through Greenbrier, Clinton, Marshall, and Valley Springs. US 65 will join US 412 and 62 before passing through Harrison. After leaving Harrison, US 412 and 62 separates from US 65 at a freeway-to-freeway interchange. US 65 becomes a divided highway. US 65 continues north to the Missouri state line and enters Missouri.

History
The original US 65 between Pine Bluff and Conway is now signed Arkansas Highway 365.

In Pine Bluff, US 65 later relocated to a bypass corridor on the north side of Pine Bluff, dubbed the Downtown Expressway. With the completion of the Interstate 530 bypass on the south side of Pine Bluff in August 1999, US 65 was rerouted along Interstate 530, and the Downtown Expressway was resigned US 65 Business.

Major intersections

See also
Special routes of U.S. Route 65

References

External links

 Arkansas
Transportation in Chicot County, Arkansas
Transportation in Desha County, Arkansas
Transportation in Drew County, Arkansas
Transportation in Lincoln County, Arkansas
Transportation in Jefferson County, Arkansas
Transportation in Grant County, Arkansas
Transportation in Pulaski County, Arkansas
Transportation in Faulkner County, Arkansas
Transportation in Van Buren County, Arkansas
Transportation in Searcy County, Arkansas
Transportation in Newton County, Arkansas
Transportation in Boone County, Arkansas
65